Nashoba Publishing is a weekly newspaper company in the far northwest suburbs of Boston, Massachusetts. It is operated by MediaNews Group in common with sister papers the  Lowell Sun and Sentinel & Enterprise.

Sisters and competitors 
The family that formerly owned Nashoba, headed by publisher Frank J. Hartnett Sr., sold the chain in 2000, for an undisclosed amount of money. Two years later, MediaNews opened a new plant in Devens, Massachusetts, in the middle of Nashoba's coverage area, to print Nashoba's weeklies, The Lowell Sun, and the Sentinel & Enterprise.

Nashoba newspapers' primary competitors are their sister dailies in Fitchburg and Lowell. Additionally, in Harvard, the company competes with a weekly owned by Community Newspaper Company; and in Ayer, Devens, Harvard and Shirley with the daily Worcester Telegram & Gazette.

Newspapers 
Nashoba's newsroom is operated  at the Devens printing plant. Titles published by Nashoba include:

References 

Newspapers published in Massachusetts
MediaNews Group